The Fiji national football team represents the country of Fiji in international association football. It is fielded by Fiji Football Association, the governing body of football in Fiji, and competes as a member of the Oceania Football Confederation (OFC), which encompasses the countries of Oceania. Fiji played their first international match on 7 October 1951 in a 6–4 loss to New Zealand in Suva.

Fiji have competed in numerous competitions, and all players who have played in at least one international match, either as a member of the starting eleven or as a substitute, are listed below. Each player's details include his playing position while with the team, the number of caps earned and goals scored in all international matches, and details of the first and most recent matches played in. The names are initially ordered by number of caps (in descending order), then by date of debut, then by alphabetical order. All statistics are correct up to and including the match played on 30 September 2022.

Key

Players

References

Fiji international footballers
Association football player non-biographical articles